Landremont is a commune in the Meurthe-et-Moselle department in north-eastern France.

The commune is the birthplace of Amélie Rigard, who as Sister Julie kept running the hospice in Gerbéviller during the village's occupation and destruction by German troops in World War I.
She was awarded the Legion of Honour.

See also
Communes of the Meurthe-et-Moselle department

References

Communes of Meurthe-et-Moselle